Millfield is a town in the City of Cessnock municipality of New South Wales.

Millfield contains a general store and the historic Rising Sun Inn, which now operates as a museum.

Millfield Public School opened in 1868. The school had an enrolment of 62 students in 2015. A second school in Millfield, Crawfordville Public School, operated from 1929 to 1970.

Millfield Post Office opened in 1854.

St Luke's Anglican Church was built in 1880. It was flagged for potential closure and sale in June 2018 as part of a diocese plan to raise funds for redress of survivors of child sexual abuse, with services to be consolidated with St John's Church in Cessnock. The church had absorbed the congregation of St. Thomas's at Ellalong when that church closed in 2014.

Millfield Cemetery, located in Hayes Road, is managed by the Cessnock City Council.

A new 100-lot residential development, the Rosehill Estate, was released for sale in May 2017. The development was controversial: the original plan for 700 houses did not go ahead, and 500 residents signed a petition against the revised plan on the grounds of overdevelopment of the historic village; however, the rezoning was approved in 2014, with a subsequent council rescission motion lost by one vote. A further 222-block development is proposed off Mount View Road. This has also been the source of controversy, as residents have protested that it could almost double the population of the village.

Heritage listings
Millfield has a number of heritage-listed sites, including:
 95-97 Wollombi Road: Rising Sun Inn
15-29 Bennett Street , Crawfordville School

References

Suburbs of City of Cessnock
Towns in the Hunter Region